Paul Myers is the name of:

 PZ Myers (born 1957), American biologist
 Paul Myers (musician) (born 1960), Canadian rock musician, journalist
 Paul Myers (record producer) (born 1967), English record producer
 Paul Myers, founding host of Christian radio program The Haven of Rest from 1934 to 1971
 Paul Walter Myers (1932–2015), English record producer and writer